Ben Bitton (or Biton, born 3 January 1991) is an Israeli association footballer who plays as a defender for Hapoel Tel Aviv.

Early life
Bitton was born in Bat Yam, Israel, to a family of Sephardic Jewish descent.

Club career

Sektzia Ness Ziona
Bitton began his career in the youth system of Hapoel Tel Aviv. In August 2010, loaned to Sektzia Ness Ziona, in order to gain playing time. On 7 August 2014, he made his debut in 2–1 victory against Hapoel Bnei Lod at the group stage of the Toto Cup.

Hapoel Nazareth Illit
After his loan period ended, he was loaned to Hapoel Nazareth Illit. He made his debut on 3 September 2012 in a 2–2 draw against Hapoel Ra'anana. On 4 February 2013, he received a red card for a first time at career against Hapoel Rishon LeZion.

Hapoel Be'er Sheva
After his loan period ended, he was released from Hapoel Tel Aviv and On 27 June 2013 signed to Hapoel Be'er Sheva, with his teammate Ben Turjeman. On 30 September 2013, he made his debut in a 2–1 league victory against Bnei Yehuda Tel Aviv. Bitton was part of a successful season for Be'er Sheva, who finished the season in 2nd place.

On 17 July 2014, he made his debut in the European Competition, in the 2–1 loss against RNK Split at UEFA Europa League qualifying. On 2 December 2014, he scored his debut career goal at the 1–1 draw against Hapoel Ironi Kiryat Shmona.

Maccabi Tel Aviv 
On 2 August 2020, Bitton joined Maccabi Tel Aviv on loan.

International career
On 25 March 2016, Bitton made his debut for Israel national team against Croatia.

Career statistics

Honours
Hapoel Be'er Sheva
Israeli Premier League: 2015–16, 2016–17, 2017–18
Toto Cup Al: 2016–17
Israel Super Cup: 2017

See also 

 List of Jewish footballers
 List of Jews in sports
 List of Israelis

References

External links

1991 births
Living people
Israeli Sephardi Jews
Israeli Jews
Jewish footballers
Israeli footballers
Israel youth international footballers
Israel international footballers
Association football defenders
Hapoel Tel Aviv F.C. players
Sektzia Ness Ziona F.C. players
Hapoel Nof HaGalil F.C. players
Hapoel Be'er Sheva F.C. players
Maccabi Tel Aviv F.C. players
Footballers from Bat Yam
Liga Leumit players
Israeli Premier League players
Israeli people of Moroccan-Jewish descent
Israeli Mizrahi Jews